Norfolk and Western 475 is a 4-8-0 "Mastodon" type steam locomotive built by the Baldwin Locomotive Works in June 1906 as part of the Norfolk and Western Railway's (N&W) first order of M class numbered 375–499. It was first assigned to haul freight trains on the N&W mainline before being reassigned to branch line duties on the Blacksburg Branch in the 1920s. 

Retired from N&W revenue service in 1957, No. 475 was sold to various different owners in Pennsylvania, Illinois, and Iowa until 1991 when it was purchased and restored by the Strasburg Rail Road (SRC) in Strasburg, Pennsylvania, where it currently runs tourist excursion trains in the Pennsylvania Dutch countryside. Since then, No. 475 became the only 4-8-0 locomotive operating in North America and the oldest operating steam locomotive on the SRC.

History

Design change and cab configuration

No. 475 was the 101st member of 125 M class steam locomotives built for N&W in 1906–07, rolling out of the Baldwin Locomotive Works in June 1906 at a cost of $15,180. No. 475 was one of the many M class locomotives that were not re-equipped with superheaters, excluding Nos. 382, 386, 429, 439, 447, 457, 459, 482, 493, and 495.

Inside No. 475's cab, the engineer sits on the right beside the firebox, which was fitted further away from the back of the cab, similar to the camelback design. Additionally, the firemen would have to shovel coal on the tender deck instead of the cab deck. On the engineer's side, the throttle lever was mounted above the firebox and the reverser lever was in front of the engineer against the side of the firebox. On the fireman's side, the water glass, injector controls, and steam gauge were also located on the other side of the firebox.

Revenue service and changing ownership
No. 475 worked on the N&W, hauling freight and coal trains on the mainline until the 1920s when it was reassigned to branch line duties on the Blacksburg Branch between Christiansburg and Blacksburg, Virginia, when bigger locomotives such as the Y class 2-8-8-2s and K class 4-8-2s arrived on the N&W. In 1957, No. 475 was backdated to look like an 1880s locomotive with brass boiler bands, a fake diamond smokestack and oil headlamp for the 75th anniversary of Roanoke, Virginia. It was later retired from the N&W and put on display in Roanoke until 1962 when it was sold to the Virginia Scrap Iron & Metal Company scrapyard. A year later, it was purchased by William Armagost from Hollsopple, Pennsylvania. In 1980, the locomotive was sold to H.S. Kuyper, and then conveyed to the Pella Historical Society, being stored at the Illinois Railway Museum in Union, Illinois. In 1982, it was purchased by C. Rosenberg and his daughters, who subsequently donated it to the Boone and Scenic Valley Railroad in Boone County, Iowa around 1985.

Excursion service at Strasburg Rail Road
In June 1991, No. 475 was purchased by Strasburg Rail Road (SRC) in Strasburg, Pennsylvania for $100,000 and was restored to operating condition on November 4, 1993, where it now operates in excursion service, pulling tourist trains in the Pennsylvania Dutch countryside between Strasburg and Paradise on the SRC. Since then, No. 475 was the only operating 4-8-0 in North America and the oldest operating steam locomotive on the SRC. However, the locomotive was the least favorite of the SRC crew due to its cramped cab. 

In 2010 and 2017, No. 475 was cosmetically altered to resemble its extinct sister locomotive No. 382 for the Virginia Creeper photo charters, hosted by Lerro Productions on separate occasions. In late 2018, it was taken out of service for its 15-year mandated Federal Railroad Administration (FRA) inspection and rebuild. It returns to active service in September 2019, backdated to its 1940s-50s appearance with the headlamp being mounted to the center of the smokebox door. That same month, No. 475 was reunited with another N&W steam locomotive, class J 4-8-4 No. 611, which visited the SRC two more times in 2021 and 2022. This would mark the first time since 1991 that two ex-N&W steam locomotives operated together.

Accident
On November 2, 2022, while running around a passenger train at Leaman Place Junction in Paradise, No. 475 collided head-on with an excavator parked on a siding. The impact punched a hole in the front smokebox plate, shattered the smokebox door and knocked the headlight onto the ground. No crew or passengers were injured, and the damage done was deemed relatively minor. The collision was broadcast live via Virtual Railfan and was caught on video via cellphone by one of the passengers on board the train that day. The accident was caused by a misaligned switch, and it is being investigated by the Federal Railroad Administration (FRA). SRC announced on November 3, the day after the accident, that repairs on the locomotive had begun. 

No. 475 was repaired and returned to service on November 7 with a new front smokebox plate and headlight since the originals were completely destroyed. The smokebox door itself was repaired by braze-welding the broken shards together, along with the addition of a reinforcing steel ring on the inside of the door. The decision was made by SRC's Chief Mechanical Officer Brendan Zeigler to leave the welded seams from the brazing process visible on the door as a reminder of the incident.

Appearances in media
No. 475 was featured in the 2000 movie, Thomas and the Magic Railroad. An interview with SRC's former Chief Mechanical Officer Linn Moedinger, who revealed that the film's producer Phil Fehrle called him looking for an American locomotive to use. When Moedinger inquired as to what exactly he was looking for, Fehrle told him that the film's director, Britt Allcroft liked the locomotives pictured in a book by O. Winston Link, in particular the M-Class locomotives (of which 475 is a member).

During filming, 475 and three of Strasburg's coaches (of which only two were used) were lettered for the fictional Indian Valley Railroad. No. 475 ventured off SRC trackage to the Harrisburg Transportation Center in Harrisburg, Pennsylvania. The ferry move to Harrisburg from Leaman Place by Amtrak, as well as the filming, was unannounced so as not to attract a crowd.

Gallery

See also
Canadian National 89
Canadian National 7312
Great Western 60
Great Western 90
Norfolk and Western 433
Norfolk and Western 578
Norfolk and Western 1218
Polson Logging Co. 2

References

Further reading

External links

 No. 475 – Strasburg Rail Road
 N&W M Class Information

4-8-0 locomotives
0475
Baldwin locomotives
Individual locomotives of the United States
Standard gauge locomotives of the United States
Preserved steam locomotives of Pennsylvania